Lincoln Hotel in Franklin, Nebraska is a hotel that was built in 1918.  It was listed on the National Register of Historic Places in 1989, but was removed from the Register in 2016.

References

Colonial Revival architecture in Nebraska
Hotel buildings completed in 1918
Buildings and structures in Franklin County, Nebraska
Hotels in Nebraska
Former National Register of Historic Places in Nebraska
National Register of Historic Places in Franklin County, Nebraska